The Journal of College Student Development is a bimonthly peer-reviewed academic journal established in 1959 and is the official publication of American College Personnel Association - College Student Educators International. The journal publishes scholarly articles and book reviews from a wide variety of academic fields related to college students and student affairs. The journal is published by the Johns Hopkins University Press and the editor-in-chief is Debora L. Liddell (University of Iowa).

External links 
 
 Journal of College Student Development at Project MUSE

Education journals
Publications established in 1959
English-language journals
Bimonthly journals
Johns Hopkins University Press academic journals